The Crossroads Fire Tower is a fire lookout tower at 2262 Arkansas Highway 133 North in Ashley County, Arkansas. The tallest tower of its type in Arkansas, it is located north of Crossett and west of Hamburg, which is just north of the junction  of Highway 133 and Ashley County Highway 12. It was built by the Aermotor Company and installed by a Civilian Conservation Corps crew in 1935. The tower is of galvanized steel construction, although the staircase landings and treads are wooden. The tower has a viewing cabin at the top with adjustable glass panes.

The tower was listed on the National Register of Historic Places in 2006.

See also
National Register of Historic Places listings in Ashley County, Arkansas

References

Buildings and structures on the National Register of Historic Places in Arkansas
Fire lookout towers in Arkansas
Fire lookout towers on the National Register of Historic Places
Civilian Conservation Corps in Arkansas
National Register of Historic Places in Ashley County, Arkansas
1935 establishments in Arkansas